Lygropia leucostolalis is a moth in the family Crambidae. It was described by George Hampson in 1918. It is found in Cameroon, the Democratic Republic of the Congo (Katanga, Kasai-Occidental, Équateur), Ghana, Sierra Leone and Uganda.

References

Moths described in 1918
Lygropia